Noordsebuurt is a village in the Dutch province of South Holland. It is a part of the municipality of Nieuwkoop, and lies about 10 km north of Woerden.

The statistical area "Noordsebuurt", which also can include the surrounding countryside, has a population of around 210.

References
 

Populated places in South Holland
Geography of Nieuwkoop